Deniz Khazaniuk (born 24 October 1994) is an inactive Israeli tennis player.

Khazaniuk has career-high WTA rankings of 200 in singles, achieved on 11 June 2018, and of 445 in doubles, achieved on 16 June 2014. She has won 21 singles titles and three doubles titles on the ITF Women's Circuit. In 2016, Khazaniuk won the Israeli Singles Championship.

Biography
Khazaniuk was born in Ashkelon, Israel. Her father German Hazniuk is an orthopedist at the Hillel Yaffe Medical Center, and her mother Larissa who imports tennis equipment, both immigrated to Israel from Ukraine.  When she was four years old the family moved to Netanya, Israel, where she lives. Her younger sister Stefany Khazaniuk is a former tennis player who currently works as a pitch-side reporter for Israel's Sport 5 Channel, and she has been in a relationship with Yair Netanyahu, son of the then Prime Minister of Israel.

In December 2016, Khazaniuk won the Israeli Singles Championship at 22 years of age, defeating Maya Tahan in the final.

In May 2019, she defeated world No. 87, Madison Brengle, at the ITF/USTA $100k in Charleston, South Carolina.

Playing for the Israel Fed Cup team, Khazaniuk has a win–loss record of 2–2, all in singles play.

ITF Circuit finals

Singles: 35 (21 titles, 14 runner–ups)

Doubles (3 titles, 4 runner–ups)

References

External links
 
 
 

1994 births
Living people
Israeli female tennis players
Israeli people of Ukrainian descent
Israeli people of Soviet descent
People from Ashkelon
People from Netanya